Fogo de Chão (meaning "ground fire") is a Brazilian chain of rodízio-style steakhouses (churrascarias) founded in 1979 by brothers Arri and Jair Coser. The restaurant chain specializes in Southern Brazilian cuisine, primarily serving churrasco barbecued meats and traditional side dishes. First established in the Brazilian city of Porto Alegre, the chain currently has over 70 locations throughout Brazil, the United States, Saudi Arabia, the UAE, Puerto Rico, and Mexico.

Description

The name Fogo de Chão means "ground fire", and refers to the traditional gaúcho method of roasting meats over an open fire. They offer either a "full churrasco experience", which includes continuous servings of fire-roasted beef, lamb, pork, chicken, and other meats, as well as a buffet or à la carte service.

The restaurants are typically located in busy metropolitan areas throughout the US. Restaurants measure on average , and typically consist of restaurant seating, a buffet-style salad bar (the "Market Table"), and a bar (referred to as "Bar Fogo"). 

The design of the locations is considered "warm and contemporary yet timeless - meant to really enhance the guests' experience". The restaurant has been renovating older restaurants to match the new design aesthetic throughout the chain.

History
The founders of Fogo de Chão, Arri and Jair Coser, grew up on a traditional Southern Brazilian farm in the Serra Gaúcha. It is here that they learned to cook in the churrasco grilling tradition. The founding brothers left the countryside of Rio Grande do Sul and traveled to Rio de Janeiro and São Paulo for formal training, while developing the Fogo concept. Their first restaurant, a wood structure in the countryside of Porto Alegre, was followed by a second restaurant in São Paulo. As Arri Coser told São Paulo-based writer Rafael Tonon, tourists who came to the São Paulo restaurant encouraged him to open a churrascaria style restaurant abroad.

In 1997, the Cosers opened their first US branch in Addison, Texas. Between 1997 and 2020, the restaurant continued its expansion globally, with 57 restaurants across the US, Brazil, Mexico, and the Middle East. The company announced plans for further growth around the world.

Ownership
The Brazilian private equity firm, GP Investments, made their initial investment in Fogo de Chão in 2006 and sold its shares to American private equity firm Thomas H. Lee Partners in 2012. On April 20, 2015, the company filed for an initial public offering on the NASDAQ. It traded there under the symbol FOGO until April 5, 2018, when it was acquired by Rhône Capital.

Other activities
In April 2019 the Boerne, Texas-based agri-tech company, HerdX announced that it would be partnering with Fogo de Chão to use blockchain technology and digital tagging to trace the provenance of the beef Fogo de Chão serves in its restaurants—ultimately allowing diners, who can scan in a HerdX-generated QR code, to know the name and location of the ranch that raised the cattle. HerdX recently completed a similar project with United Parcel Service shipments of Texas ranch-raised beef to Japan.

During the COVID-19 pandemic, Fogo de Chão restaurants in Troy, Michigan, San Francisco, and in other cities, have worked with the non-profit, No Kid Hungry to donate meals to needy families, hospitals, and other institutions.

In popular media
Fogo de Chão was mentioned on Amazon’s original series The Boys, season 1, episode 2.

See also
 List of steakhouses

References

External links
 Official website

Theme restaurants
Steakhouses
Steakhouses in the United States
Barbecue restaurants
Brazilian restaurants
Companies formerly listed on the Nasdaq
2015 initial public offerings
Companies based in Dallas
Fine dining
American companies established in 1979
1979 establishments in Texas
Restaurants established in 1979
Multinational restaurant chains